Cantharellus tabernensis is a species of fungus in the family Cantharellaceae that was described as new to science in 1996. It is found in the southern United States, where it grows in mixed pine and hardwood forests, close to mature Pinus elliottii trees. Fruit bodies have a yellowish-brown cap with a slightly darker brown center, and a bright orange gills and stipe. The specific epithet tabernensis refers to the meeting house at the Stennis Space Center Recreation area, near the type locality.

References

External links

tabernensis
Fungi of the United States
Edible fungi
Fungi described in 1996
Fungi without expected TNC conservation status